Nataliya Lovtsova, also romanized Natalia Lovtcova, (born 14 April 1988) is a Russian swimmer. At the 2012 Summer Olympics, she competed for the national team in the Women's 4 x 100 metre freestyle relay, finishing in 10th place in the heats, failing to reach the final. In the same year Lovtsova was suspended for two-and-a-half years after she breached anti-doping regulations.

References

1988 births
Living people
Olympic swimmers of Russia
Swimmers at the 2012 Summer Olympics
Swimmers at the 2016 Summer Olympics
Russian female freestyle swimmers
Doping cases in swimming
Russian sportspeople in doping cases